The 2012 International GT Open season was the seventh season of the International GT Open, the grand tourer-style sports car racing founded in 2006 by the Spanish GT Sport Organización. It began on 28 April at Portimão and finished on 4 November, at Circuit de Catalunya after eight double-header meetings.

The season was won by AF Corse drivers Gianmaria Bruni and Federico Leo, who raced on the Ferrari F458 GT Italia. They also won the Super GT standings. Michael Dalle Stelle and Daniel Zampieri, who raced behind the wheel of Kessel Racing's Ferrari F458 Italia GT3 won the GTS class.

Race calendar and results
 The series' provisional calendar was announced on 29 October 2011.

Standings

Drivers

Super GT

Teams

Super GT

References

 2012 International GT Open final standings

External links
Official website

International GT Open
International GT Open seasons